The Shadow Cabinet of Alec Douglas-Home was created on 16 October 1964 following the defeat in the 1964 general election.

Shadow cabinet list

See also

List of British governments
Official Opposition of the United Kingdom

References 

Official Opposition (United Kingdom)
British shadow cabinets
Shadow cabinets
1964 in British politics
1964 establishments in the United Kingdom
1965 disestablishments in the United Kingdom
Alec Douglas-Home